Boomerangiana is a monotypic genus of Australian crab spiders in the tribe Misumenini containing the single species, Boomerangiana dimidiata. The species was originally described in 1867 by  Ludwig Koch from an immature female found in Brisbane. Though he originally placed it with Xysticus, after several more were found in  Rockhampton and Gayndah and more information became available, he moved the species to Diaea. It was moved to its own genus in 2014 named Boomerangia, but was renamed Boomerangiana when it was discovered that the name was already in use for a family of nematodes.

See also
 Diaea
 Xysticus
 Boomerangia
 List of Thomisidae genera

References

Monotypic Thomisidae genera
Spiders of Australia